The 2016–17 Iowa Hawkeyes women's basketball team represented the University of Iowa during the 2016–17 NCAA Division I women's basketball season. The Hawkeyes, led by seventeenth-year head coach Lisa Bluder, played their home games at the Carver–Hawkeye Arena and were members of the Big Ten Conference. They finished the season 20–14, 8–8 in Big Ten play to finish in a tie for eighth place. They lost in the second round of the Big Ten women's tournament  to Northwestern. They were invited to the Women's National Invitation Tournament where they defeated Missouri State, South Dakota, Colorado in the first, second and third rounds before losing to Washington State in the quarterfinals.

Roster

Schedule

|-
! colspan="9" style="background:#000; color:#fc0;"| Exhibition

|-
! colspan="9" style="background:#000; color:#fc0;"| Non-conference regular season

|-
! colspan="9" style="background:#000; color:#fc0;"| Big Ten regular season

|-
! colspan="9" style="background:#000; color:#fc0;"| Big Ten Women's Tournament

|-
!colspan=9 style="background:#000;"| Women's National Invitation Tournament

See also
2016–17 Iowa Hawkeyes men's basketball team

Rankings

References

Iowa Hawkeyes women's basketball seasons
Iowa
2017 Women's National Invitation Tournament participants
Iowa Hawkeyes
Iowa Hawkeyes